Facundo Bagnis and Diego Schwartzman were the defending champions, but chose not to compete together. Bagnis chose to partner with Guido Pella, but lost in the semifinals to Guilherme Clezar and Fabrício Neis. Schwartzman chose not to compete.

Seeds

Draw

References
 Main Draw

Campeonato Internacional de Tenis de Campinas - Doubles
2015 Doubles